The Men's China Squash Open 2014 is the men's edition of the 2014 China Squash Open, which is a tournament of the PSA World Tour event International (Prize money : 70 000 $). The event took place in Shanghai in China from 4 to 7 September. James Willstrop won his first China Squash Open trophy, beating Peter Barker in the final.

Prize money and ranking points
For 2014, the prize purse was $70,000. The prize money and points breakdown is as follows:

Seeds

Draw and results

See also
PSA World Tour 2014
China Squash Open
Women's China Squash Open 2014

References

External links
PSA China Squash Open 2014 website
China Squash Open 2014 SquashSite website

Squash tournaments in China
China Squash Open
Squash Open
Men's China Squash Open